Ararah is a Gram panchayat in Hajipur in the Vaishali district, state of Bihar, India.

Geography
This panchayat is located at

panchayat office
panchayat bhawan ararah (पंचायत भवन ararah )

Nearest City/Town
Hajipur (Distance 4 km)

Nearest major road highway or river
State highway 74 ( nearest state highway )
And 
Other roadway

compass

Villages in panchayat
There are  villages in this panchayat

References

Gram panchayats in Bihar
Villages in Vaishali district
Vaishali district
Hajipur